WLJM-LP (95.3 FM) is a radio station licensed to serve the community of Miami Beach, Florida. The station is owned by Calvary Chapel of Miami Beach, Inc. It airs a religious format.

The station was assigned the WLJM-LP call letters by the Federal Communications Commission on April 24, 2015.

See also 
 List of radio stations in Florida
 List of religious radio stations

References

External links
 Original Website
 

LJM-LP
Radio stations established in 2016
2016 establishments in Florida
Miami Beach, Florida
LJM-LP